Orion is the name of various ships and a ship class:

Naval
 , Royal Swedish Navy signals intelligence ship
 , Royal Australian Navy submarine
 , various British Royal Navy ships
 , British Royal Navy battleship class
 , various U.S. Navy ships
 BAE Orion, Ecuadorian Navy ship, originally 
 , a Nazi German auxiliary cruiser
 , Royal French Navy ship of the line

Civilian
 , a Swedish salvage ship and museum ship
  (also known as MS Orion, MY Orion), a National Geographic exploration ship
 , an Arctic ice-strengthened cargo ship
 , an Orient Steam Navigation modified 
 , a British ferry which sank in 1850
 Orion, a heavy lift vessel (HLV) operated by DEME Offshore, a subsidiary of the DEME Group.

References

Ship names